Tanvir Sadiq is the Chief Spokesperson of Jammu and Kashmir National Conference and Advisor to the former chief minister of Jammu and Kashmir Omar Abdullah.

Born in Srinagar into a political family, he did his schooling from Burn Hall School, Srinagar, and Tyndale Biscoe Memorial. Afterward, He earned a bachelor's degree in Information Technology and Management.

He commenced his political career as an elected corporator (City council member). He then became the Spokesperson of the Jammu & Kashmir National Conference party.  This was followed by a stint as political secretary to the former Chief Minister of Jammu and Kashmir Omar Abdullah. He is now the political advisor to him. The former was a government position and the latter is a party political one. He was nominated as the Chief Spokesperson of Jammu and National conference party. He is the youngest in the party to get such an important assignment.

Tanvir was a part of the International visitors leadership program of the United States of America. The IVLP is one of the US Governments most prestigious professional programs for International opinion leaders. Three former PM's and many former CM's have been a part of this program in the past. He was amongst the 8 politicians invited by the United States of America under the auspices of their International visitor leadership program entitled “U.S Legislative processes for young political leaders.

Tanvir has also been a part of the delegation by the British High Commission for the “Indian politicians visit to the UK” 
He was amongst the 12-member delegation comprising leaders cutting across party lines across India. The visits objective was to deepen the delegates’ understanding of the UK. British politics, domestic policy priorities, foreign policy, and trade and investment ambitions.

His hobbies pertain largely to politics. He states this passion by writing on politics, social issues and matters relating to empowerment of youth and women. He has contributed in various local, national and International newspapers like The Gulf News, the Hindu, India Today and the Greater Kashmir. Being the media panelist for his party, He represents it on various news channels both nationally and internationally  and is also a known blogger.

Politics in Kashmir is a risky vocation: He and his family have survived almost a dozen attacks but that has not deterred him from the desire to work towards public good. He is committed to principals and ideals of his party-notwithstanding the danger and risks.

Tanvir Sadiq is the son of a senior politician of the erstwhile state of Jammu and Kashmir Sadiq Ali, and grandson of Jaffer Ali who was a papier-mâché artist and an entrepreneur from Srinagar, Kashmir.

Biography

Early life and education
Born on 7 January at Srinagar. Sadiq did his schooling at the Burn Hall Srinagar, and Tyndale Biscoe Memorial. Afterward he earned a bachelor's degree in Information Technology and Management.

Political career
He was the Head of the National Conference Cyber Cell, was elected as a corporator (member of city council) of the Srinagar Municipal Corporation, was re-elected as the Leader of the Opposition and was a mayoral candidate twice. Sadiq worked as a member of two prestigious committees of the corporation and represented the corporation at various seminars.

Tanvir was the political advisor to former Chief Minister of Jammu and Kashmir.

Tanvir is a prominent voice & the media face of the party. He is an ardent supporter of Chief Minister Omar Abdullah.

Achievements and present stand

He remains a staunch supporter of Omar Abdullah and has been writing extensively in his favour with arguments. He believes Omar Abdullah has not only a lot of potential but the only one who can deliver. He has been attacked for his outburst against the atrocities committed by the Paramilitary and the Militants and has been harassed a number of times by some agencies for his criticism over the human rights issue. His passport had also been withheld reportedly on this pretext. Sadiq writes for Jammu and Kashmir's largest circulated newspaper the Greater Kashmir and sometimes for other local papers like the Kashmir Times.

Tanvir is also a columnist for India's largest News Papers India Today  "Apply the same yard stick"
Mail Today "Does India need a Hero". He also writes for the Gulf News and the Hindu.

Tanvir believes that Kashmir's destiny lies in communal harmony and brotherly relations between India and Pakistan, that will make borders irrelevant and give the youth of the state an opportunity to contribute to the removal of barriers. He also believes that to ensure the success of the peace process, youth must have a say and their fate should not be left in the hands of people who neither understand the global compulsions nor the economic aspects of modern-day polity.

Sadiq has survived many attacks by terrorists.

Tanvir has in past contested election as an independent candidate.

Manifesto

1. Restoration of Autonomy to the state of Jammu and Kashmir
2. Revocation of AFSPA from areas which are peaceful
3. Empowerment of youth & women.

Excerpts

 A sub-continental conference of the Indo-Pak youth both in Srinagar and Muzaffarabad.
 Persuade both India and Pakistan for greater student exchange between the two countries.
 Environmental awareness. Both in two parts of the state and devising a solution that can safeguard the environment.
 Considering the substantial damage that the state has suffered from various natural calamities, formulate a comprehensive disaster management policy with total involvement of the youth on both sides.

References

External links 
The Gulf News The cynical assumptions of Delhi
The Hindu Resolving the Kashmir impasse
India Today/Mail Today Jammu and Kashmir CM Omar Abdullah picks Tanvir Sadiq as National Conference spokesman
The Asian Age.Tanvir Sadiq, Sokesperson for National Conference
Conveyor Magazine (2010).Past Haunts Passports, page 40
The Times of India.Tanvir Sadiq attacked
The Hindu (2007).PDP Leader escapes bid on life.
The OUTLOOK India Magazine.Mayoral Candidate
The Daily Excelsior (2008).Councillor Attacked
YouTube (2010). Kashmir.The Young Leaders
Srinagar Municipal Corporation (2010).SMC WEBSITE.
The Tribune India.PDP Councillor
The Rising Kashmir (2008–2010).Mandate
Kashmir As I See It (2010).BLOG.
DNA Denied party Ticket
Greater Kashmir (2002–2010).Perspective OP-ED, Kashmir Press, 2002–2010.
The Daily Excelsior.NC MLA, family escape bid on life
The Kashmir Times Editorial
Independent Voice Power Politics
Election Office Affidavit Details of Tanvir Sadiq Ali

People from Jammu and Kashmir
People from Srinagar district
Living people
Jammu & Kashmir National Conference politicians
Jammu and Kashmir local politicians
Year of birth missing (living people)